JASP (Jeffreys’s Amazing Statistics Program) is a free and open-source program for statistical analysis supported by the University of Amsterdam. It is designed to be easy to use, and familiar to users of SPSS. It offers standard analysis procedures in both their classical and Bayesian form. JASP generally produces APA style results tables and plots to ease publication. It promotes open science by integration with the Open Science Framework and reproducibility by integrating the analysis settings into the results. The development of JASP is financially supported by several universities and research funds.

Analyses
JASP offers frequentist inference and Bayesian inference on the same statistical models. Frequentist inference uses p-values and confidence intervals to control error rates in the limit of infinite perfect replications. Bayesian inference uses credible intervals and Bayes factors to estimate credible parameter values and model evidence given the available data and prior knowledge.

The following analyses are available in JASP:

Other features
 Descriptive statistics.
 Assumption checks for all analyses, including Levene's test, the Shapiro–Wilk test, and Q–Q plot.
 Imports SPSS files and comma-separated files.
 Open Science Framework integration.
Data filtering: Use either R code or a drag-and-drop GUI to select cases of interest.
Create columns: Use either R code or a drag-and-drop GUI to create new variables from existing ones.
Copy tables in LaTeX format.
Plot editing, Raincloud plots.
PDF export of results.
Importing SQL databases (since v0.16.4)

Modules 

 Audit: Planning, selection and evaluation of statistical audit samples.
 Summary statistics: Bayesian inference from frequentist summary statistics for t-test, regression, and binomial tests.
 Bain: Bayesian informative hypotheses evaluation for t-test, ANOVA, ANCOVA and linear regression.
 Network: Network Analysis allows the user to analyze the network structure of variables.
 Meta Analysis: Includes techniques for fixed and random effects analysis, fixed and mixed effects meta-regression, forest and funnel plots, tests for funnel plot asymmetry, trim-and-fill and fail-safe N analysis.
Machine Learning: The machine Learning module contains 19 analyses for supervised an unsupervised learning:
Regression
Boosting Regression
Decision Tree Regression
K-Nearest Neighbors Regression
Neural Network Regression
Random Forest Regression
Regularized Linear Regression
Support Vector Machine Regression
Classification
Boosting Classification
Decision Tree Classification
K-Nearest Neighbors Classification
Neural Network Classification
Linear Discriminant Classification
Random Forest Classification
Support Vector Machine Classification
Clustering
Density-Based Clustering
Fuzzy C-Means Clustering
Hierarchical Clustering
Neighborhood-based Clustering (i.e., K-Means Clustering, K-Medians clustering, K-Medoids clustering)
Random Forest Clustering
SEM: Structural equation modeling.
JAGS module
Discover distributions
Equivalence testing
Cochrane meta-analyses

References

External links
 
 

Free Bayesian statistics software
Free educational software
Free statistical software
Software using the GNU AGPL license